Famouz is the debut studio album by Puerto Rican rapper Jhayco, released on May 24, 2019, through Universal Music Latino. It was produced by Sky Rompiendo, Tainy, E.T.F. Exel the Future, Mvsis, Taiko, Ammunation, Erick Ant, Misael de la Cruz, Haze and Jhayco himself, and features collaborations with J Balvin, Bad Bunny, Rafa Pabón, Almighty, Tainy, C. Tangana and Zion & Lennox. A special edition of the album titled Famouz Reloaded was released on January 24, 2020, featuring collaborations with Karol G, Haze, Wisin & Yandel, Ozuna and Myke Towers.

The album peaked at numbers 5 and 165 at the US Billboard 200 and Top Latin Albums charts, respectively. Additionally, it was certified platinum in United States in 2020.

Background 
On August 22, 2017, Cortez signed with the label Universal Music Latino under the House of Haze movement in alliance with the producer Fino como el Haze, who also produced his first single "Donde No Se Vea", released later in the year. The following year, Cortez worked on the composition of various songs such as Yandel's "Mi Religión", Daddy Yankee's "Otra Cosa" and the collaboration "Criminal" by Natti Natasha and Ozuna. Prior to the released of Famouz, Cortez released the nine-track EP Eyez On Me on May 18, 2018.

A special edition of the album was released on January 24, 2020 as Famouz Reloaded composed of the songs from Famouz alongside five additional songs, two being original songs, "Déseame Suerte" with Karol G and Haze, and "Como Se Siente", and three being remixes of songs previously featured in the original album, "Imaginaste" with Wisin & Yandel, "Easy" with Ozuna and "Subiendo de Nivel" featuring Myke Towers.

Singles 
The first single for the album was "Costear", with Cuban rapper Almighty, released on October 31, 2018. The second singles was "No Me Conoce", released on February 22, 2019, a remix of the song with Bad Bunny and J Balvin was released later in 2019. The remix was commercially successful, peaking at number 4 and 71 at the Hot Latin Songs and Billboard Hot 100 charts, respectively, being Cortez first appearance on both charts.

To promote the release of Famouz Reloaded, two singles were released, "Deséame Suerte" with Karol G and Haze on August 30, 2019, and the remix of "Easy" with Ozuna on November 19, 2019. Both "Costear" and "Deséame Suerte" were certified gold in United States while the remix of "No Me Conoce" was certified platinum selling over a million of copies by 2020.

Critical reception 
American magazine Rolling Stone included the album in their list of Best Latin Albums of 2019, placing it at number four, writing that "while the music landscape is littered with the bodies of hit-writers who have attempted to transition to solo stardom, Cortez made the switch look easy this year", they also commented that the album was "tenacious and hummable throughout, incorporating bracing production from Tainy (on the imperious "Imaginaste") and Taiko ("Easy")".

Accolades

Track listing

Charts

Certifications

References 

2019 debut albums
Jhayco albums
Spanish-language albums
Universal Music Latino albums
Albums produced by Sky Rompiendo
Albums produced by Tainy